Sporting Club de Bastia is a French professional football club based in Stade Armand Cesari, Bastia.

The club has won total of five major trophies, including the Ligue 2 twice, the Championnat National once, the Coupe de France once, the Trophée des Champions once and the UEFA Intertoto Cup once.

This list details the club's achievements in major competitions, and the top scorers for each season. Top scorers in bold were also the top scorers in the French league that season.

Keys 

 P = Played
 W = Games won
 D = Games drawn
 L = Games lost
 F = Goals for
 A = Goals against
 Pts = Points
 Pos = Final position

 Div 1/Ligue 1 = Ligue 1
 Div 2/Ligue 2 = Ligue 2
 Chmp. Nat. = Championnat National

 F = Final
 Group = Group stage
 QF = Quarter-finals
 QR1 = First Qualifying Round
 QR2 = Second Qualifying Round
 QR3 = Third Qualifying Round
 QR4 = Fourth Qualifying Round
 PO = Play-off

 R1 = Round 1
 R2 = Round 2
 R3 = Round 3
 R4 = Round 4
 R5 = Round 5
 R6 = Round 6
 R7 = Round 7
 R8 = Round 8
 E64 = End of 64
 E32 = End of 32
 E16 = End of 16
 SF = Semi-finals

Seasons

Notes and references 

Seasons
 
Bastia

fr:Sporting Club de Bastia#Historique des compétitions